"Sousou" is a song by French rapper Jul released on 26 March 2020, alongside a music video. It peaked at number three in the French SNEP Singles.

Charts

Certifications

References 

2020 singles
2020 songs
French-language songs